Miguel Alfonso (born 9 August 1976  in Spain) is a Spanish retired footballer who now works at Bemiser in his home country.

Career

Alfonso started his senior career with Deportivo Aragón. In 2000, he signed for Airdrieonianss in the Scottish Championship, where he made eighteen appearances and scored one goal. After that, he played for Scottish club Raith Rovers and Spanish clubs CD Badajoz, SD Huesca, Cultural y Deportiva Leonesa, CD Leganés, and UD Fuerteventura before retiring in 2008.

References

External links
 Miguel Alfonso Interview

Spanish expatriate footballers
Association football defenders
Expatriate footballers in Scotland
1976 births
Living people
Real Zaragoza B players
CD Badajoz players
CD Leganés players
Cultural Leonesa footballers
Airdrieonians F.C. (1878) players
Raith Rovers F.C. players
SD Huesca footballers
Real Zaragoza players
Spanish footballers